RS-127445 is a drug which acts as a potent and selective antagonist at the serotonin 5-HT2B receptor, with around 1000x selectivity over the closely related 5-HT2A and 5-HT2C receptors. The role of the 5-HT2B receptor in the body is still poorly understood, and RS-127445 has been a useful tool in unravelling the function of the various systems in which this receptor is expressed.

References 

5-HT2B antagonists
Aminopyrimidines
Naphthalenes
Fluoroarenes
Isopropyl compounds